Batiz may refer to:

People with the surname
András Batiz (born 1975), Hungarian news anchor and government spokesperson
César Batiz, Venezuelan investigative journalist
Enrique Batiz, Orquesta Conductor, Royal Filarmónica, Estado de México
Martha Batiz (Zuk) (born 1971), Mexican-Canadian writer

Places
Batiz, a village in Călan town, Hunedoara County, Romania